Valeri Nikolayevich Zhabko (born 18 August 1967) is a former Russian professional footballer.

Club career
He made his professional debut in the Soviet Second League in 1985 for FC Torpedo Volzhsky. He played 3 games in the UEFA Cup 1994–95 for FC Tekstilshchik Kamyshin.

References

1967 births
People from Vichuga
Living people
Soviet footballers
Russian footballers
Association football defenders
Russian Premier League players
FC Energiya Volzhsky players
FC Rotor Volgograd players
FC Tekstilshchik Kamyshin players
FC Saturn Ramenskoye players
FC Sokol Saratov players
FC Metallurg Lipetsk players
Sportspeople from Ivanovo Oblast